My Education: A Book of Dreams (1995) is the final novel by William S. Burroughs to be published before his death in 1997. It is a collection of dreams, taken from various decades, along with a few comments about the War on Drugs and paragraphs created with the cut-up technique. The book is dedicated to Michael Emerton (January 18, 1966 - November 4, 1992).

Explanation of the novel's title
The title is explained in the very first dream, dated 1959: Burroughs is trying to board an airplane, but a woman at the ticket counter "with the cold waxen face of an intergalactic bureaucrat" refuses him passage, informing him, "You haven't had your education yet."

Plot summary

Most of the dreams are concerned with mundane affairs: talking to his friends Ian Sommerville, Allen Ginsberg and Brion Gysin; protecting his cats; trying to get sex, drugs or something to eat. There are flying dreams, erotic suitcase-packing dreams, dreams of being bullied by men in uniforms. There are references to strange drugs such as "Jade" and "Bogomolets Anti-Human Serum 125." In addition, there are other segments which seem unconcerned with dreams at all, such as a chapter where Burroughs instructs the reader on how to create botulism.  There is a place he refers to as the Land of the Dead, which, like Interzone, seems to be a conglomeration of many cities: Tangiers, London, Paris, and others.

1995 novels
Novels by William S. Burroughs
Viking Press books